The PSA Group, legally known as Peugeot S.A. (Peugeot Société Anonyme, trading as Groupe PSA; formerly known as PSA Peugeot Citroën from 1991 to 2016) was a French multinational automotive manufacturing company which produced automobiles and motorcycles under the Peugeot, Citroën, DS, Opel and Vauxhall brands. On 18 December 2019, PSA and Fiat Chrysler Automobiles (FCA) announced that they had agreed to the terms of a binding $50 billion merger. On 16 July 2020, both companies announced the new name for their merged operations, Stellantis. The deal closed on 16 January 2021. Stellantis is now the third largest automotive manufacturing company, behind only Volkswagen and Toyota.

Peugeot was the largest PSA brand. PSA was listed on the Euronext Paris stock exchange and was a constituent of the CAC 40 index.

Beginning in 2016, PSA began to outline a strategy which entailed the rapid expansion of the company, through both geographic expansion and acquisitions of other car companies. PSA has announced plans to enter the Indian, American, Canadian, South East Asian, and other markets in the coming years.

Headquartered in Rueil-Malmaison, PSA, with sales of 3.88 million units in 2018, was the third-largest Europe-based automaker, just a fraction behind Renault.

In 2019, Groupe PSA was the ninth largest automaker in the world, after Volkswagen, Toyota, the Renault–Nissan–Mitsubishi Alliance, General Motors, Hyundai Motor Group, Ford Motor Company, Honda, and Fiat Chrysler Automobiles.

History

Citroën acquisition 
In December 1974 Peugeot S.A. acquired a 38.2% share of Citroën. On 9 April 1976 they increased their stake of the then bankrupt company to 89.95%, thus creating the PSA Group (where PSA is short for Peugeot Société Anonyme), becoming PSA Peugeot Citroën. Since Citroën had two successful new designs in the market at this time (the GS and CX) and Peugeot was typically prudent in its own finances, the PSA venture was a financial success from 1976 to 1979.

Chrysler Europe acquisition 

In late 1978, PSA purchased the failing Chrysler Europe (which had been Rootes and Simca) from the troubled US parent firm for a nominal US$1.00, plus assumption of outstanding debt, leading to losses for the consortium from 1980 to 1985. Further investment was required because PSA decided to create a new brand for the entity for the disparate French and British models, based on the Talbot sports car last seen in the 1950s. From then on, the whole Chrysler/Simca range was sold under the Talbot badge until production of Talbot-branded passenger cars was shelved in 1987 and on commercial vehicles in 1992.

All of this investment caused serious financial problems for the entire PSA group; PSA lost money from 1980 to 1985. There were some bright spots, however: mainly thanks to the success of the Peugeot 205 and in spite of Talbot sales withering away, PSA surpassed Renault in sales in the domestic French market for the first time in 1983. In 1987, the company dropped the Talbot brand for passenger cars when it ceased production of the Simca-developed Horizon; the Samba and Alpine/Solara had been discontinued a year earlier. What was to have been the Talbot Arizona became the Peugeot 309, with the former Rootes plant in Ryton and Simca plant in Poissy being turned over for Peugeot assembly from October 1985. Producing Peugeots in Ryton was significant, as it signaled the first time that PSA would build cars in the UK (car assembly at Ryton stopped in 2006 and the plant was closed). The Talbot name survived for a little longer on commercial vehicles until 1992 before being shelved completely. From 1987 to 1995, the Ryton plant also produced the Peugeot 405 saloon.

Crisis (2012–2014) 

On 29 February 2012, PSA announced the creation of a major alliance with General Motors (GM), as part of which GM became PSA's second-largest shareholder, after the Peugeot family, with a holding of 7%. The alliance was intended to enable $2 billion per year of cost savings through platform sharing, common purchasing and other economies of scale.

In July 2012, a union official said that PSA Peugeot Citroën would cut as much as 10 percent (8,000-10,000) of its French workforce of 100,356 employees on permanent and temporary contract. The jobs cut was more than previously announced.

On 24 October, PSA said it was close to an agreement with creditor banks on €11.5 billion ($14.9 billion) of refinancing and had won state guarantees on €7 billion in further borrowing by its Banque PSA Finance.

On 12 December 2013, General Motors announced it was selling its 7% stake in PSA Peugeot Citroën to Padmapriya Automobile Investment Group.

In 2014, Dongfeng Motor Group, the Chinese partner that builds PSA cars in China, and the French government each took a 13% stake in PSA, in a financial rescue operation, reducing the Peugeot family share from 25% to 14%.

Rapid expansion 

Following Dongfeng and the French government each acquiring stakes in Groupe PSA, various cost-cutting measures at the company turned its fortune around and gradually reduced PSA's debt, until the company began to turn a profit beginning in 2015. A new CEO, Carlos Tavares, was engaged and began to implement various cost-cutting measures and expanded the model range of all three core brands, alongside the creation of a new brand, DS Automobiles.

In early 2016, PSA unveiled a roadmap detailing its plan to re-enter the North American car market for the first time since 1991.

Acquisition of 'Ambassador' brand from Hindustan Motors 
On 10 February 2017, PSA announced a 50:50 joint venture with the CK Birla Group, the owner of the Hindustan Motors to sell Peugeot, Citröen, and DS vehicles in India and purchase of the Ambassador brand from Hindustan Motors at the cost of INR 80 Crore.

Acquisition of Opel and Vauxhall Motors 
On 14 February 2017 PSA announced that it was in talks to acquire Opel and Vauxhall Motors from General Motors. The talks were in an advanced stage, but were a surprise to the press and to much of Opel's leadership as they had plans to transform the company into an electric-car-only brand using the platform of the Opel Ampera-e for a wide range of models. GM agreed to continue to supply PSA with Ampera-e and other electric vehicle technology. In August 2017, PSA completed acquisition deal of Opel and Vauxhall.

GM reported a loss of US $257 million from its European operations in 2016, sixteenth consecutive loss-making year for GM in Europe, bringing its amount of losses on the continent since 2000 to more than US $15 billion. Some expressed concerns about what this major acquisition might do to PSA's bottom line. However, due to this amount of debt, it is likely that GM may give the brands to PSA, or sell Opel and Vauxhall at a highly reduced price. Tavares expects synergies a decade after the takeover.

PSA CEO Carlos Tavares met with German Chancellor Angela Merkel and British Prime Minister Theresa May at separate meetings where he toured some of Opel and Vauxhall's operations in Germany and the UK, respectively. He assured the leaders that jobs would be safeguarded and that Vauxhall's Ellesmere Port plant was to be used by PSA at least until 2021.

Tavares announced that he wants Opel to keep its German brand identity and to embrace it, and that he would leverage Opel's pedigree of German engineering and Motorsport and use the company's heritage to reach markets and customers that may not consider a French car due to perceived reliability issues. He also announced that the Opel and Vauxhall brands would be elevated to new heights within Groupe PSA, including the sale of Opel and Vauxhall-branded vehicles outside Europe for the first time in many decades.

Bid for Proton 
On 17 February 2017, PSA announced its bid to acquire PROTON Holdings, which owns the Proton and Lotus brands, but lost out to Geely a few months later.

Merger with FCA 
In May 2019 Fiat Chrysler Automobiles (FCA) announced its intention to seek a merger with Groupe Renault. However, in early June merger talks were suspended, and never resumed. On 31 October 2019, Groupe PSA announced intent to merge with FCA. The merger would be on a 50-50 all stock basis. On 18 December 2019, FCA and PSA announced that they had agreed to the terms of a binding $50 billion merger, expected to be implemented in the next 12 months. The new group is incorporated in the Netherlands and has John Elkann as Chairman of the Board and Carlos Tavares as CEO. On 15 July 2020, the two companies announced that the merged entity will be named Stellantis, from the "Latin verb 'stello' meaning 'to brighten with stars.'" On 4 January 2021, both shareholders of PSA and FCA approved the merger and the deal was closed on 16 January 2021.

Operations
The Peugeot, Citroën and DS Automobiles brands retain separate sales and marketing structures, but share common technology, development and assembling assets.

Jean-Martin Folz was PSA's CEO between 1996 and early 2007, when he was replaced by former Airbus head Christian Streiff. Streiff was sacked on 29 March 2009, a day after the company posted a full year loss for 2008. Streiff was replaced by Corus Group chief executive Philippe Varin. Carlos Tavares became CEO in 2014.

Developing markets
PSA was actively committed to developing its market presence and sales in many fast growing developing countries and regions of the world. This led to huge investments and partnerships in South America, Iran (Iran Khodro) and China (Dongfeng Peugeot-Citroën Automobile). It announced plans to invest €650 million in a manufacturing plant in Sanand, India. With a capacity of 170,000 vehicles, the Sanand plant started production of the aaa in 2020. In Kazakhstan, assembly of the Peugeot passenger cars will start in June 2013 with a production capacity of 4,000 units per year at the beginning and more than 10,000 units in the near future. A PSA plant was opened in 2018 in Tunisia and in 2019 in Kenitra in Morocco.

Citroën will enter the Indian market in early 2021, with the launch of the C5 Aircross SUV manufactured at a plant in Tiruvallur, India.

Peugeot Citroën Automobiles SA
The manufacturer of Peugeot, Citroën and DS Automobiles-branded cars and vans, 100% owned by PSA Group and formed from the combination of Automobiles Citroën and Automobiles Peugeot. Automobiles Citroën, Automobiles Peugeot, and DS Automobiles remain in operation in relation to specific retail operations in various countries but not in the development or manufacture of vehicles.

PSA PowerTrain (Formerly Peugeot Citroën Moteurs)
PSA PowerTrain is a manufacturer of petrol and diesel engines for a range of companies including Ford, Jaguar, BMW, and Land Rover. It was founded by Peugeot in 1898 in Lille and later named Compagnie Lilloise de moteurs (CLM). In 1992 SCM-CLM as it was then known became Peugeot Citroën Moteurs.

The company has had a partnership with Ford Motor Company since 1998, supplying diesel engines to Ford and its subsidiaries, such as Jaguar, Volvo, and Land Rover.

PSA and BMW have an agreement to develop the 1.6 Prince engine. PSA also sell their engines, gearboxes and other parts to small independent manufacturers such as DeLaChapelle and PGO. This PSA Peugeot Citroën 1.6-litre turbo petrol engine has received the International Engine of the Year awards a total of eight times, from 2007 to 2014.

Process Conception Ingénierie
Process Conception Ingénierie (PCI) is a French-based manufacturer of machine-tools for the automotive and aircraft industry.

Peugeot Motocycles
Peugeot Motocycles is 51.05% owned by India's Mahindra Group and the rest by Peugeot and manufactures a range of mopeds and scooters. The subsidiary owned 50% of the Chinese Jinan Qingqi Peugeot Motocycles joint venture in 2006 which became wholly owned subsidiary of China South Industries Group in 2013.

Faurecia

PSA owns 57.43% of automotive supplier Faurecia, a company created by a 1997 merger between Bertrand Faure and PSA-owned ECIA. It provides various components to Peugeot, Citroën, DS and significant interior and exterior parts to companies such as Audi, BMW and Mercedes-Benz.

Gefco

Gefco is a large international logistics company, established by Peugeot in 1949 and named Les Groupages Express de Franche-Comté. In November 2012, PSA sold a 75% share to Russian Railways (RZD) for €800m, but retains Gefco as the main logistics provider.

Motaquip
Motaquip is an all-makes aftermarket parts company and was established in the UK by PSA Peugeot Citroën in 1981. In December 2014 Motaquip was sold to an outside company to become independent of PSA as "Motaquip Limited". The head office is now based in Nuneaton, UK, with all parts distributed from a warehouse in Luton, UK.

Financial services
PSA wholly owns Banque PSA Finance which provides financial services, and 98.67% of GIE PSA Tresorerie which was founded in 1990 as a treasury and cash management services division.

Former marques and subsidiaries
A number of marques were inherited following the acquisition of Chrysler Europe in 1978, and some were merged to re-establish Talbot, a previously dormant marque.

Chrysler Europe marques included the British Sunbeam (1901–1976), Humber (1868-1976), Singer (1905–1970), Commer (1905–1979), Hillman (1907–1976), Karrier (1908–1977), the French Simca (1934–1977) and the Spanish Barreiros (1959–1978).

Cycles Peugeot produced bicycles from 1882 until 2005. In 1987 ProCycle of Canada acquired rights to distribute French-made Peugeots in North America and in 1990, Cycles Peugeot sold the North American rights to market bicycles under the Peugeot name to ProCycle. In 2001, ProCycle discontinued the Peugeot bicycle brand.  In Europe, the licence to produce Peugeot-branded bicycles was sold to Cycleurope, a company making bicycles under different names, on condition that it would be reconsidered in 2004. That license was later withdrawn for Europe, though production of bicycles for export continued for another year.

Citer SA is a French-based car rental company established by Citroën in 1968 was sold to Enterprise Holdings in 2011.

Joint ventures and collaborations

Sevel SpA

Sevel (Société Européenne de Véhicules Légers SA and Società Europea Veicoli Leggeri-Sevel S.p.A.) was established in 1978 and is equally owned by PSA Group (Peugeot Citroën DS) and Fiat. As a result of this, two factories have been built assembling three ranges of vehicles, Sevel Nord and Sevel Sud. Peugeot and Fiat's Argentinian operations were also joined under the name of Sevel Argentina S.A. (Sociedad Europea de Vehículos para Latinoamérica), although Fiat withdrew in 1995. Currently Sevel builds the Fiat Ducato, Peugeot Boxer, and Citroën Jumper.

Dongfeng Peugeot Citroën Automobile

The joint venture with the Chinese company Dongfeng Motor Corporation (later Dongfeng Motor Group) was established in 1992 and produces the Citroën C-Triomphe, 207, 307 and 408 models at factories in Wuhan and Xiangyang.

Peugeot Citroën Mitsubishi Automotiv Rus
The Kaluga factory was built by the Russian-based joint venture between PSA Peugeot Citroën (70%) and Mitsubishi Motors (30%) established in 2011. The site builds the Mitsubishi Outlander, Pajero Sport, and the Peugeot 308 and Citroën C4. From 2018, Peugeot Expert and Citroën Jumpy are built on site.

IKAP (Iran Khodro Automobiles Peugeot)

The joint venture with Iran Khodro was established in 2016 and produces some Peugeot models and imports other models in CBU for Iran market. IKAP is a 50–50 joint venture with the Iran Khodro, based in Tehran.

Other interests
In 2008, the company investigated the option to buy Mitsubishi Motors but a deal could not be concluded and was called off in 2010. One outcome of the talks resulted in the Mitsubishi Outlander and Mitsubishi i-MiEV to be sold as Peugeot and Citroën in Europe.

Former joint ventures
 Toyota Peugeot Citroën Automobile Czech, the joint venture with PSA and Toyota for the development and manufacturing of a series of city cars in a new factory in the Czech Republic was signed. The resulting company is called TPCA (Toyota Peugeot Citroën Automobile). It manufactures the Citroën C1, Peugeot 108 and Toyota Aygo. This joint venture was ended in late 2020 and has been takeover by Toyota in early 2021.
 Guangzhou Peugeot Automobile Company (GPAC) was in operation from 1985 to 1997 and produced the Peugeot 504 and 505.
 In 2011, PSA Peugeot Citroën and BMW agreed to establish BMW Peugeot Citroën Electrification as an equal joint venture to develop and manufacture hybrid components including battery packs, generators, power electronics and chargers, and software for hybrid systems. The company was dissolved with the end of 2012 due to the alliance of PSA Peugeot Citroën with General Motors.
 Changan PSA was a 50–50 joint venture with the Chinese Chang'an Automobile Group, based in Shenzhen with an initial annual production capacity of 200,000 vehicles & engines. It produces cars of the DS Automobiles brand. In 2020, CAPSA was dissolved following the sale of the each 50% stakes of PSA and Changan to Baoneng Group.

Locations

Head office
The head office of PSA Group is located in Rueil-Malmaison. The group has been renting the building since 2017, right after its construction.

United Kingdom 
In the United Kingdom, Peugeot Motor Company PLC is a wholly owned United Kingdom subsidiary of PSA Peugeot Citroën that operates the Peugeot UK, Citroën UK, and DS Automobile brands. Peugeot UK's retail arm is Robins & Day which was part of Rootes Group before becoming a wholly owned subsidiary of Peugeot Motor Company PLC in 1970.

Other locations
PSA has a number of manufacturing and development sites around the world. Vigo, in Galicia has PSA's biggest factory in the world. The PSA Mangualde Plant in Portugal produced its millionth vehicle in 2012.

PSA invested 4 billion establishing new plant in Chennai, India.

The group announced on 29 November 2016 at the Tunisia's investment conference 2020 it will open a factory plant in the country in mid-2018. The factory will have a planned annual production of 1,200 units.

Groupe PSA (Paris:UG) has chosen to establish its new North American headquarters in Atlanta, Fulton County, Georgia. The headquarters will be operational by February 2018. A core team has already been set up to build the strategy and steer its execution. The decision to locate in Atlanta came after a yearlong, nationwide search to find the optimal balance of business environment, standard of living and workforce.

Vehicles

Notable vehicles and innovations

Hybrid Air

PSA Group exhibited the "Hybrid Air" engine, an experimental petro-hydraulic hybrid, at the 2013 Geneva Motor Show. The engine is the result of a secret development project involving about 100 people. The basic technology is not new—it has been used in heavy vehicles such as garbage trucks or buses which frequently start and stop—but its application to passenger cars is. The vehicle uses nitrogen gas compressed by energy harvested from braking or deceleration to power a hydraulic drive which supplements power from its conventional gasoline engine. The hydraulic and electronic components were supplied by Robert Bosch GmbH. Production versions were scheduled for 2015 or 2016 to sell at about US$25,000 or £17,000. Mileage was estimated to be about 3.5 L/100 km or 80 miles per gallon for city driving if installed in a Citroën C3.

Awards

Peugeot, Citroën, Chrysler Europe and DS vehicles have won many awards for their vehicles including: ten times the European Car of the Year award, 12 times the "Car of the year" Auto Europa award in Italy, 18 times the "car of the year" in Spain, and five times the "Irish Car of the Year" award.

European Car of the Year award winners:
 1969 – Peugeot 504
 1971 – Citroën GS
 1975 – Citroën CX
 1976 – Simca 1307-08
 1979 – Simca Horizon
 1988 – Peugeot 405
 1990 – Citroën XM
 2002 – Peugeot 307
 2014 – Peugeot 308 II
 2017 – Peugeot 3008 II
 2020 – Peugeot 208 II

See also
 List of manufacturers by motor vehicle production

References

External links

  (archived, 4 Nov 2021)

 
Predecessors of Stellantis
2021 disestablishments in France
2021 mergers and acquisitions
Companies formerly listed on the Paris Bourse
Car manufacturers of France
Motorcycle manufacturers of France
Diesel engine manufacturers
Luxury motor vehicle manufacturers
Electric vehicle manufacturers of France
Conglomerate companies of France
Multinational companies headquartered in France
Conglomerate companies established in 1976
Vehicle manufacturing companies established in 1976
Vehicle manufacturing companies disestablished in 2021
Government-owned companies of France
French companies established in 1976
French companies disestablished in 2021